Mia Freedman, also known as Mia Lavigne, (born 1 October 1971) is the co-founder of women’s digital media company Mamamia. She was the youngest editor of the Australian edition of Cosmopolitan in 1996, aged 24.

Career
Freedman began her career at Cleo, doing work experience at the age of 19. Her first paid job in media was as Cleo's beauty editor and she stayed at Cleo for five years working her way up to the position of features editor. She left Cleo in 1995 and spent several months as a freelance features writer for magazines including Marie Claire, New Weekly and Who Weekly. In 1996, aged 24 years, she became editor of Australian Cosmopolitan magazine, the youngest editor of Cosmopolitan's 58 international editions.

Freedman is also the founder, publisher and editorial director of Australian women’s website Mamamia. In 2012, Freedman also launched an Australian edition of parenting website iVillage. This was rebranded as The Motherish in June 2015. All content for The Motherish was folded into Mamamia by November 2015.

Freedman has appeared regularly as a commentator on Today on the Nine Network and Ten's The Project. In 2009 Freedman was appointed Chair of the Australian Government's National Body Image Advisory Group by Minister for Sport and Youth, Kate Ellis. In 2015 Freedman disclosed in an interview that she suffers from an anxiety disorder.

Freedman has written four books, including Work Strife Balance, where Luca, her 19-year-old son, contributed a chapter describing his mother as having "no filter".

Personal life
Freedman is the only daughter of Laurence Freedman , a funds manager and chairman of The Freedman Foundation, and his wife, Kathy, a psychologist and art gallery owner. Freedman was raised Jewish and grew up in Sydney. She attended the Ascham School.

In 1998, Freedman married Jason Lavigne, with whom she has three children. In 1999, Freedman had a miscarriage and spent two years in therapy, separated from Lavigne.

Published works

References

External links
Mamamia website

Living people
1971 births
Australian columnists
Australian women columnists
Australian freelance journalists
Australian people of South African descent
Australian television personalities
Women television personalities
Jewish Australian writers
People educated at Ascham School
Australian women editors